The 4th annual Genie Awards were held March 23, 1983, at the Royal Alexandra Theatre in Toronto.  The ceremony was hosted by comedian Dave Thomas.

The Grey Fox was the event's big winner, with seven awards including Best Picture. The film also topped the overall nomination count, with 13 nominations.

In the category for best adapted screenplay, the award to Richard Paluck and Robert Guza Jr. for Melanie was later rescinded, as the short story on which the screenplay was based had not been previously published.

Nominees and winners

References

External links
Genie Awards 1983 at IMDb

04
Genie
Genie